Jamie Mosley (born December 7, 1969) is an American professional stock car racing driver. He last competed part-time in the NASCAR Camping World Truck Series, driving the No. 50 Chevrolet Silverado for Beaver Motorsports and the No. 15 Silverado for Premium Motorsports.

Racing career

Nationwide Series
Mosley made his debut in 2003 with Jay Robinson Racing in the Xfinity Series. In 2004, he left his team, Race Kentucky Motorsports, and became a free agent. He attempted one race each in 2004 (26th), 2005 (37th), 2006 (35th), 2007 (40th), and 2012 (29th).

Camping World Truck Series
Mosley ran one race in 2009 in the Truck Series at Kentucky. He started 28th and finished 29th due to clutch problems. 

In 2018, Mosley returned to NASCAR after a six year hiatus, driving the No. 50 Chevrolet Silverado for Beaver Motorsports at Kansas. He finished 28th after starting 26th.

ARCA Racing Series
Mosley ran three races each in the 2002 season and 2003 season. In the final standings, he finished 80th in 2002 and 95th in 2003.

Personal life
In 2010, Mosley was elected as jailer of the Laurel County. In December 2012, he started a company selling e-cigarettes called Crossbar Electronic Cigarettes, which later sponsored him in his 2018 Kansas Truck race.

Motorsports career results

NASCAR
(key) (Bold – Pole position awarded by qualifying time. Italics – Pole position earned by points standings or practice time. * – Most laps led.)

Nationwide Series

Camping World Truck Series

 Season still in progress
 Ineligible for series points

ARCA Re/Max Series
(key) (Bold – Pole position awarded by qualifying time. Italics – Pole position earned by points standings or practice time. * – Most laps led.)

References

Living people
1969 births
NASCAR drivers
Racing drivers from Kentucky
People from Laurel County, Kentucky

External links